Adna is an unincorporated community located in Lewis County, Washington.

Etymology
An early resident, J.G. Browning named the town "Willoway" for the saying "Where there's a will, there's a way", the favorite saying of his wife, Edna. In 1892, the town's name was changed by the railroad to Pamona to distinguish it from the Willapa townsite. However, the town was required to change the name again as another Pomona, Washington existed.

Two different versions for arriving at the current, official name are recorded. Historical archives indicate that the moniker was chosen as "Edna", after Edna Browning, with the first letter subsequently changed because a post office, Edna, was already in use. Other research has the town renamed by a railway superintendent on behalf of a family member, Adna Marian, in 1894.

Geography
The town of Littell is 1.5 miles to the east. The town straddles Washington State Route 6. A paved parking lot and trailhead are located in Adna for access to the Willapa Hills Trail.

Government and politics

Politics

Adna is recognized as being majority Republican and conservative.

The results for the 2020 U.S. Presidential Election for the Adna voting district were as follows:

 Donald J. Trump (Republican) - 838 (72.49%)
 Joe Biden (Democrat) - 275 (23.79%)
 Jo Jorgensen (Libertarian) - 31 (2.68%)
 Other candidates - 2 (0.17%)
 Write-in candidate - 10 (0.87%)

Education
Adna is home to the Adna School District, which includes two schools: Adna Elementary and Adna Middle/High School. One of the first schools to serve Adna was built in 1893 and was known as the Bell Tower School.

Services
The post office is located in the Adna Grocery building.

References

Populated places in Lewis County, Washington
Unincorporated communities in Lewis County, Washington
Unincorporated communities in Washington (state)